Trinity Hall is the main extramural hall of residence for students of the University of Dublin, Trinity College in Dublin, Republic of Ireland. It is located on Dartry Road in Dartry near Rathmines, about three miles south of the college.

History
The first extramural hall established by Trinity College under the name Trinity Hall was located near Hoggen Green (now College Green), on land which had originally been intended for use as a 'bridewell' or house of correction for vagrants. The land, located to the west of Trinity, was sold to the college by Dublin Corporation for the sum of £30 on condition that it be converted for educational use. A Master was appointed, buildings were constructed, and the site was used for teaching and residence by students from 1617 onwards.

However, during the course of the 1641 Rebellion the site was occupied by poor people from the city. The hall having fallen into decay (which the College at the time could not afford to repair), Trinity discontinued its teaching there, causing the corporation to seek that the site revert to their ownership on the grounds that the agreements for its use were not being upheld. The situation was resolved by John Stearne, a medical doctor and senior fellow at Trinity, who arranged to have the hall repaired without further expense to the College in return for himself being made its president and for the site being redesignated for the sole use of physicians. The daughter college thus founded in 1654 eventually received a royal charter as the Royal College of Physicians of Ireland in 1667, and in the years following Stearne's death it gained virtual independence from Trinity.

The grounds comprising the current Trinity Hall first came under the college's ownership in 1908 when a house named 'Glen-na-Smoil' was purchased in Dartry as a move towards establishing a hall of residence for women. Much of the funds came from donations by the Chancellor, Lord Iveagh, and Frederick Purser, a senior fellow, as well as almost all of the fees paid by female Oxford and Cambridge students (the so-called steamboat ladies) for conferral of University of Dublin degrees under the system of ad eundem gradum recognition that exists between the three universities (Oxford and Cambridge not permitting female students to receive degrees for their study at the time). The site was extended in 1910 with the donation of the adjacent Palmerston House and its grounds by John Griffith, who renamed it Purser House in memory of the then-deceased Purser, a relative of his.

The hall continued as a residence for females until the 1970s, when the first men were admitted. 
By the 21st century, there was a focus on housing first year undergraduates, with a smaller number of places set aside for second year students and postgraduates (House 86).  
In 2004 a controversial €95m project to hugely increase the number of bedspaces at Trinity Hall opened to students.  This allowed Trinity Hall to accommodate over 1000 students, rather than the 180 it had up until then.  The modern residence comprises 12 separate houses (numbered 80 – 91, continuing on from the numbering system used on the Trinity College campus itself), in 3 blocks, each house featuring around 10–20 apartments. Most accommodate five to six people, but there are some single apartments for staff.  The older house (Cunningham House/House 79) is still in use.  It contains older single study bedrooms, where each apartment accommodates 14 people.

The rooms in Trinity Hall are allocated by the warden, on behalf of the Provost of Trinity College.  The warden and assistant wardens are also responsible for ensuring discipline in residents.  The warden lives, with their family, in Purser House on the Trinity Hall site.  The current warden is Roja Fazaeli, PhD.

JCR
Trinity Hall is the base of Trinity College Dublin's JCR, a body of second-year students who organise events, pursue the interests of the students and care for student welfare.

References

External links
 Trinity Hall Warden – official site
 Accommodation Office – Trinity Hall
 Trinity Hall Student Residences, Dartry, Dublin

Buildings and structures of Trinity College Dublin
Rathmines
University and college residential buildings in Ireland
Royal College of Physicians of Ireland